Bryk is a surname. Notable people with the name include:

Anthony Bryk, American educational researcher
Dan Bryk (born 1970), Canadian singer-songwriter and recording artist
Felix Bryk (1882–1957), Swedish anthropologist and entomologist 
Greg Bryk (born 1972), Canadian film and television actor
Rut Bryk (1916–1999), Finnish ceramist
William Bryk (born 1955) New York bankruptcy attorney and perennial candidate

See also
Brik (surname)